The San Marcos Province is one of the thirteen provinces in the Cajamarca Region of Peru. It was created by Law No. 23508 on December 11, 1982 by president Fernando Belaunde Terry. The province is crossed by several rivers, the most important of which is the Marañón.

Political division
The province is divided into seven districts.
 Pedro Galvez (San Marcos)
 Chancay (Chancay)
 Eduardo Villanueva (La Grama)
 Gregorio Pita (Paucamarca)
 Ichocan (Ichocán)
 José Manuel Quiroz (Shirac)
 José Sabogal (Venecia)

Notes

Provinces of the Cajamarca Region